Each team's roster for the 2013 IIHF World Championship consists of at least 15 skaters (forwards, and defencemen) and 2 goaltenders, and at most 22 skaters and 3 goaltenders. All sixteen participating nations, through the confirmation of their respective national associations, had to submit a roster by the first IIHF directorate meeting.


Legend

Austria
Head coach: Emanuel Viveiros

A 25-player roster was announced on April 27.

Skaters

Goaltenders

Belarus
Head coach: Andrei Skabelka

Skaters

Goaltenders

Canada
Head coach: Lindy Ruff

A 22-player roster was announced on April 27.

Skaters

Goaltenders

Czech Republic
Head coach: Alois Hadamczik

Skaters

Goaltenders

Denmark
Head coach: Per Bäckman

Skaters

Goaltenders

Finland
Head coach: Jukka Jalonen

Skaters

Goaltenders

France
Head coach: Dave Henderson
A 25-player roster was announced on April 30.

Skaters

Goaltenders

Germany
Head coach: Pat Cortina

A 25-player roster was announced on April 27.

Skaters

Goaltenders

Latvia
Head coach: Ted Nolan

Skaters

Goaltenders

Norway
Head coach: Roy Johansen

Skaters

Goaltenders

Russia
Head coach: Zinetula Bilyaletdinov

Skaters

Goaltenders

Slovakia
Head coach: Vladimír Vůjtek

A 25-player roster was announced on April 29.

Skaters

Goaltenders

Slovenia
Head coach: Matjaž Kopitar

Skaters

Goaltenders

Sweden
Head coach: Pär Mårts

Skaters

Goaltenders

‡ Elias Fälth started the tournament with number 33, but changed to 81 following the inclusion of Henrik Sedin.

Switzerland
Head coach: Sean Simpson

A 25-player roster was announced on April 28.

Skaters

Goaltenders

United States
Head coach: Joe Sacco

A 23-player roster was announced on April 27.

Skaters

Goaltenders

References

Team rosters

Austria
Belarus
Canada
Czech Republic
Denmark
Finland
France
Germany

Latvia
Norway
Russia
Slovakia
Slovenia
Sweden
Switzerland
United States

External links
IIHF.com

rosters
IIHF World Championship rosters